"Ring Dem Bells" is the first episode of the eighth series of the British comedy series Dad's Army. It was originally transmitted on 5 September 1975.

Synopsis
The platoon are going to be featured in a film to help the war effort, but are annoyed to find they are playing the Nazis. Chaos ensues when they are mistaken for real German soldiers, triggering an invasion alert.

Plot
The platoon are to be featured in a film to help the war effort. Private Pike, a keen cinema-goer, is very excited but once the film producers arrive to measure them for uniforms, it becomes clear that the men are going to be playing the Nazis. Despite his protests, Captain Mainwaring is informed that they will be only in the distance anyway. Mainwaring is measured for his uniform, but they do not have an officer's uniform to fit him. Instead, Wilson and Pike are chosen to be the officers. Mainwaring is excused from appearing in the film by the Colonel.

The platoon are dressed as German soldiers for their parts. Pike is enjoying his turn as an officer, goosestepping around and acting like the German officers he has seen at the cinema. Mainwaring informs the platoon that they must stay inside Jones' van to avoid being spotted and creating an alarm.

Once they reach the film location, they are met by the producer who says that the filming has been postponed due to a problem with the lead actors, much to the platoon's disgust. Mainwaring halts outside the "Six Bells" public house to telephone Headquarters. Pike sees the pub and persuades Wilson that, now they are officers, they should all go for a drink. Thus the platoon converge upon the pub dressed as Nazis, much to the shock of the landlord, who tells his barmaid to warn the village.

Mainwaring discovers what has happened and orders the men outside, where they are met by an angry mob who accuse Mainwaring of being a quisling. The landlord telephones Walmington-on-Sea to tell the Home Guard that Nazis are heading their way. Unfortunately, the telephone is answered by Warden Hodges and the Vicar, who assume the landlord is drunk. After going outside and seeing the backs of the platoon, who are still dressed as Nazis and Mainwaring (whom Hodges declares a traitor) speaking to them, they decide to sound the alarm by ringing the church bells.

The platoon realise what is going on and they rush to the church to try and stop the bells, but the door is locked. Mainwaring tells Pike to phone GHQ and inform them it is not an invasion. They eventually get in after Wilson unbolts the door from the inside, and find a terrified Hodges, Vicar and Verger hanging from above by the bell ropes. Pike returns to inform Mainwaring that he had managed to stop the Coldstream Guards and a whole armored division from coming. Laughing, Pike adds that the whole south coast was on red alert and the Brigadier himself wanted to know what "blithering idiot" was responsible. Pike tells Mainwaring that he has made him an appointment to see the Brigadier at 10:30 tomorrow.

Cast

Arthur Lowe as Captain Mainwaring
John Le Mesurier as Sergeant Wilson
Clive Dunn as Lance Corporal Jones
John Laurie as Private Frazer
Arnold Ridley as Private Godfrey
Ian Lavender as Private Pike
Bill Pertwee as ARP Warden Hodges
Jack Haig as Mr Palethorpe, the Landlord
Robert Raglan as The Colonel
Felix Bowness as Special Constable
John Bardon as Harold Forster
Hilda Fenemore as Queenie Beal
Janet Mahoney as Doris, the Barmaid
Adele Strong as Lady with the Umbrella
Colin Bean as Private Sponge

Notes
The title is a reference to Duke Ellington's 1930 song of the same name.
BBC audience research at the time found that Ian Lavender had "surpassed himself" in his performance in a story giving him the "chance to display his versatility and comedy talent". Lavender has also said this was one of his favourite episodes.

References

Dad's Army (series 8) episodes
1975 British television episodes